A moving average is a calculation to analyze data points by creating a series of averages of different subsets of the full data set.

Moving average may also refer to:

 Moving-average model, an approach for modeling univariate time series models
 Moving average filter, a finite impulse response filter in digital signal processing
 Convolution, a moving average in other mathematical contexts

See also
 Trix (technical analysis), a triple moving average